(released internationally as Deadman Inferno) is a 2015 Japanese action comedy zombie film directed by Hiroshi Shinagawa. It was released in Japan on May 16, 2015. A four-part mini-series prequel was also released.

Cast
Aikawa Shō as Hiroya Munakata
Sawa Suzuki as Sakura
 as Tammachi
Daisuke Migakawa as Akira Yoshida
Kubozuka Yōsuke as Shirakawa
Shingo Tsurumi as Takashi
Red Rice as Shinya
Shunsuke Kazama as Shigeru
Daigo as Uchida
Kavka Shishido as Naomi
Kunihiro Kawashima as Joe
Maika Yamamoto as Hyuga
Erina Mizuno as Seira
Hannya as Sakuta
Yukiko Shinohara as Megumi
Hideo Nakano as Kiyama

Reception
The film has grossed  at the Japanese box office.

References

External links
 

2015 action comedy films
2015 comedy horror films
Japanese action comedy films
Japanese comedy horror films
Zombie comedy films
2015 films
2010s Japanese films